Rassvet is a rural locality (a settlement) and the administrative center of Rassvetovsky Selsoviet of Romanovsky District, Altai Krai, Russia. The population was 288 in 2016. There are 6 streets.

Geography 
Rassvet is located 31 km northeast of Romanovo (the district's administrative centre) by road. Maysky is the nearest rural locality.

References 

Rural localities in Romanovsky District, Altai Krai